Torymus is a genus of chalcid wasps from the family Torymidae which was named by the Swedish naturalist Johan Wilhelm Dalman in 1820. Most species are ectoparasitoids of gall forming insects. There are more than 400 spp. worldwide.

See also
 List of Torymus species

References

External links
 Bugguide.net. Genus Torymus

Hymenoptera genera
Taxa named by Johan Wilhelm Dalman
Chalcidoidea